The Gymnastics competition of the 2010 Summer Youth Olympics in Singapore took place at the Bishan Sports Hall. There were events in Artistic, Rhythmic and Trampoline Gymnastics.

Competition schedule

Artistic Gymnastics

Rhythmic Gymnastics

Trampoline Gymnastics

Medal summary

Artistic Gymnastics

Boys' Events

Girls' Events

Rhythmic Gymnastics

Trampoline Gymnastics

Medal table

References 

 Schedule
 Official Site

 
2010 Summer Youth Olympics events
Youth Summer Olympics
Gymnastics in Singapore
International gymnastics competitions hosted by Singapore